Pelekas is a village in the central part of the island of Corfu, Greece.  It is part of the municipal unit of Parelioi.  In 2011 its population was 405 for the village and 612 for the community.  Pelekas is located southwest of the city of Corfu.

Settlements 

The community Pelekas consists of the following villages:
 Pelekas
 Agios Onoufrios
 Avramis
 Glyfada
 Kokkinogeia
 Plakoto

Population

See also 
List of settlements in the Corfu regional unit

References

External links 
 Pelekas.com the Pelekas Homepage
 Pelekas at the GTP Travel Pages

Populated places in Corfu (regional unit)